Orino is a comune (municipality) in the Province of Varese in the Italian region Lombardy, located about  northwest of Milan and about  northwest of Varese.

Orino borders the following municipalities: Azzio, Cocquio-Trevisago, Cuvio.

Population history

References

External links
 www.orino.info

Cities and towns in Lombardy